"Calypso" is a song recorded by Puerto Rican singer and songwriter Luis Fonsi and English rapper and singer Stefflon Don. Fonsi co-wrote the song with Dyo, Stefflon Don and its producers Andrés Torres and Mauricio Rengifo. The song was first released through Universal Music Latin Entertainment on June 14, 2018 as the third single from his tenth studio album, Vida. A remixed version of the song with Colombian singer Karol G (In place on Don), was released on August 18, 2018. The song reached number one in Argentina and Chile, as well as the top 10 in Bolivia, Panama and Spain.

Release
The track was released along with a music video on June 14, 2018. "Calypso" gained 1.7 million US streams and 5,000 downloads sold in the week ending June 21. The song's official video has more than 200 million views on YouTube since its release. The song is featured in the 2018 dance video game Just Dance 2019

Track listings
Digital download
"Calypso" – 3:19

CD single
"Calypso" – 3:20
"Calypso"  – 3:20

Charts

Weekly charts

Remix

Year-end charts

Certifications

See also
List of Billboard number-one Latin songs of 2018

References

 

2018 songs
2018 singles
Stefflon Don songs
Luis Fonsi songs
Karol G songs
Songs written by Luis Fonsi
Universal Music Latino singles
Spanglish songs
Macaronic songs
Male–female vocal duets
Songs written by Stefflon Don
Song recordings produced by Andrés Torres (producer)
Songs written by Andrés Torres (producer)
Songs written by Mauricio Rengifo